The 2000 Historic Grand Prix of Monaco was the second running of the Historic Grand Prix of Monaco, a motor racing event for heritage Grand Prix, Voiturettes, Formula One, Formula Two and Sports cars.

Report 
In Race A, Barrie Williams put on a strong recovery drive from the back of the grid to finish third.

Stirling Moss was entered for Race C in a Ferrari 225 S but Willie Green took his place in the race.

Race D featured a tense lead battle between Martin Stretton and Nigel Corner, the latter driving the Maserati 250F with which Juan Manuel Fangio had won the 1957 Monaco Grand Prix. Corner retired with gearbox failure and soon afterward the 250F of Klaus Edel dropped a large amount of oil at Sainte Devote. This caused Gregor Fisken and Spencer Flack to crash out of third and fifth respectively, and the race was red-flagged after seven of the scheduled ten laps. Moss's winning 250F from 1956 also featured in the race.

Driving a Caravelle in Race E was James Hicks, son of the marque's founder Robert.

Race F featured former F1 drivers Moss, who finished seventh, and Maurice Trintignant, the latter reunited with the Cooper T45 he had driven to victory in the 1958 Monaco Grand Prix.

Results

Summary

Série A: Pre 1934 two-seater Grand Prix cars

Série A: Pre 1952 Grand Prix Cars

Série C: Pre 1959 Sports Cars with drum brakes

Série D: Pre 1961 Front Engined Grand Prix Cars

Série E: Formula Junior - (1958-1963)

Série F: Pre 1966 Rear Engined Grand Prix Cars

References 

Historic motorsport events
Monaco Grand Prix
Historic Grand Prix of Monaco
Historic Grand Prix of Monaco